Cromer Lifeboat Station is an RNLI station located in the town of Cromer in the English county of Norfolk. The station operates two lifeboats - one for inshore work and the other for offshore work. 

The current lifeboat station on the end of Cromer Pier was re-built between 1997 and 1999 to replace the smaller 1923 one which was re-located to Southwold in Suffolk where it is used as a lifeboat museum. The new boathouse cost approximately £3 million which was funded by bequests and private donations. Cromer Lifeboat station is one of the most famous of the lifeboat stations operated by the RNLI.

There has been a lifeboat service operated from Cromer for two centuries - predating the establishment of the RNLI. The volunteer crews at Cromer have gained a record of gallantry stretching back to the beginnings of the RNLI. Some of the most notable rescues and service have been carried out by famous coxswains such as Henry Blogg and Henry "Shrimp" Davies and their crews. To date there have been awards of 45 Bronze medals, 8 Silver medals and 3 Gold medals.

History
In the early days of the station the lifeboats were kept outdoors on the east jetty. From 1804 the privately operated service was funded by a subscription fund which was administered by a local committee led by Lord Suffield, the third baron of Gunton Hall. Other dignitaries on the committee included George Wyndham of Cromer Hall, Thomas Mickleburgh, a local merchant, Joseph Gurney, a Cromer draper and Benjamin Rust who was a grocer. This was the situation of the service until 1857, when with the lifeboat organisation falling into financial troubles and the lifeboats falling into a bad state of repair, the Royal National Lifeboat Institution took over the Cromer station along with other Norfolk Association stations. By this time the association had built a lifeboat house which once stood some 100 yards from the high-water mark close to what is now the inshore lifeboat station. The RNLI altered and renovated this station at a cost of £46.2s.7d. but by the mid-1860s this station had outlived its usefulness and a new boathouse was planned. The new site was on the east gangway and in 1867 work started on the new station. The new boathouse work also  included building an extension to the sea walls and a slipway across the top of the beach. The work cost £476.4s.0d and was carried out by a local builder by the name of E. Simmons. The cost of the station was met by Benjamin Bond Cabbell who had also bought the new lifeboat for the station.

Fleet
The station operated two offshore boats from 1923. The second boat was replaced by an inshore lifeboat (ILB) in 1967.

All-Weather lifeboats

No. 2 lifeboat 
When the station received its first motor lifeboat, a No. 2 station was established located in the old boathouse. It was closed in 1967 when the station received an inshore lifeboat.

Inshore lifeboat

Gallery

See also
List of RNLI stations

References 

Lifeboat stations in Norfolk
Cromer